Hauken Rock is a rock lying nearly  east of the Ornen Rocks and  northeast of Cape Melville, the eastern extremity of King George Island, in the South Shetland Islands. It was named by the UK Antarctic Place-Names Committee in 1960 from association with Ornen Rocks. Hauken and Ørnen, the first two modern whale catchers, accompanied the floating factory ship Admiralen to the South Shetland Islands in January–February 1906.

References

Rock formations of King George Island (South Shetland Islands)